The Scott Ol' Ironsides is an early homebuilt aircraft using wood construction with stressed fiberglass panel construction.

Design
Ol' Ironsides is a strut-braced high-wing aircraft with conventional landing gear arrangement. The wooden fuselage is made of Sitka Spruce. Fiberglass composite skins were formed in 4 x 8 sheets using two layers of cloth with resin over a waxed Masonite table. The landing gear legs, fuel tank, wink tips, wheel pants, and cowling were also formed out of fibre-glass. Scott integrated elements of the Bowers Fly Baby and Champion J-1 Jupiter construction with the Wittman Tailwind airfoil and general layout into the design.

Operational history
Construction of the aircraft was started in the mid-1960s starting with a model rather than a drawing. Ol' Ironsides first flew on 22 November 1969 with a Continental C-85 engine sourced from a Cessna 140. In 1985 the prototype aircraft was restored and re-engined with a Continental O-200 and Sterba wooden propeller.

Specifications (Ol' Ironsides)

See also

References

Homebuilt aircraft